Tomorrow's Pioneers ( Ruwād al-Ghad), also known as The Pioneers of Tomorrow, is a Palestinian children's television show. The series was broadcast by the Hamas-affiliated television station Al-Aqsa TV from April 13, 2007 to October 16, 2009, and featured young host Saraa Barhoum and her co-host, a large costumed animal as they perform skits (or "scenes") and discuss life in Palestine in a talk show fashion with call-ins from children (typically of age 9–13 with some as young as 3). Presented in a children's educational format similar to such other preschool shows as Sesame Street or Barney & Friends, Tomorrow's Pioneers is highly controversial as it contains antisemitism, Islamism,  anti-Americanism, and other anti-Western themes.

The original host of Tomorrow's Pioneers and Farfour, Hazim Al-Sha'arawi, stated that it was his idea that Farfour be killed by an Israeli interrogator, adding that the show "wanted to send a message through this character that would fit the reality of Palestinian life." El-Sharawi states, "A child sees his neighbors killed, or blown up on the beach, and how do I explain this to a child that already knows? The [Israeli] occupation is the reason; it creates the reality. I just organize the information for him." Al-Aqsa's TV deputy manager stated that the program in fact is simply "about Palestinian kids express[ing] their feeling[s] regarding what they witness -- if it's [the] occupation it's about that..."

The show is considered to be the successor to an earlier Hamas-broadcast children's radio program series entitled Ovan and Branches. Broadcast weekly on Fridays and running for 85 minutes, the program is also moderated by Hazim Al-Sha'arawi. Israeli sources have characterized it as "the 'most serious' of martyrdom operations." Arabic sources have said that the broadcasts of Ovan and Branches have been jammed by Israel in the past.

Characters

Saraa Barhoum (April 2007–October 2009) 

Saraa Barhoum was a young girl in hijab who hosted Tomorrow's Pioneers. She was invited to host the show after entering a singing competition.  The show's director,  Hazim Al-Sha'arawi, has stated that Saraa was the ideal choice to present the show because "she has witnessed incursions, demolishing of houses, day and night shelling and random continuous firing." In an interview, Saraa revealed that "Israelis [had] hit next door to [her] house with a shell. [She] was wounded on [her] feet and [her] little brother Youssef was wounded in the legs." Despite the tenor of Tomorrow's Pioneers, Saraa has pointed out that "We are not terrorists. We do not support terrorism. We are normal people, but we are defending our homeland ... We, as Muslims, are against suicide bombers. We are against the death of civilians on all sides. We are only the enemy of those who took our land and kill us every day."

During gaps between shooting Tomorrow's Pioneers, Saraa took the opportunity to develop her singing career and she has performed several concerts in support of her music. She recorded several songs with Palestinian children's songwriter, Fekry Namous, and has starred in at least one music video which was hosted for a time at the Palestinian PALN internet network. In this video Saraa sings about the Hamas youth movement, its presence in the schools, and of the division between Israel and Palestine. This video has been criticized for promoting the message "that death, not life, is the prime value" Most recently, recording studio Al-Molatham has shot a high-quality music video of the song "Deprived you of Attiari" from her first album. The video features Saraa singing a plaintive song about being a mother in Palestine while walking through rubble. Images of gravely injured infants are displayed in the background.

Saraa has seven siblings, her father is a university professor and her uncle, Fawzi Barhoum, is a Hamas spokesman. In an August 2007 interview, Saraa said she wanted to be a doctor, and if not that, then a martyr.

Uncle Hazim (April–May 2007)

Hazim Al-Sha'arawi, the show's creator and moderator, has appeared in several episodes. The uncle of Farfour (Saraa's first co-host, a murine), Uncle Hazim (also rendered as Uncle Hazem) often plays the role of the disciplinarian when Farfour is bad. In episode 101 he chides Farfour for speaking in English and in episode 104 he holds Farfour initially responsible for cheating on his exam. It is not clear whether Uncle Hazim is the uncle of Farfour's cousins Nahoul (an apiforme) and Assoud (a leporid) as well.

Farfour (April 2007–June 2007) 

Farfour (also rendered as Farfur), a Mickey Mouse-like mouse, is a costumed character with a high-pitched voice who co-hosted Tomorrow's Pioneers with Saraa. His name comes from a diminutive of fa'r which means "mouse" in Arabic.

On the show, Farfour has expressed controversial views. He has stated such things as: "You and I are laying the foundation for a world led by Islamists" and "We will return the Islamic community to its former greatness, and liberate Jerusalem, God willing, liberate Iraq, God willing, and liberate all the countries of the Muslims invaded by the murderers." In episode 103, he simulates shooting an AK-47 and throwing grenades.

In episode 105 (aired June 22, 2007), Farfour is beaten to death during an interrogation by an Israeli who is trying to acquire the key and title to "Tel al-Rabi", a fictional Palestinian settlement which was occupied by Israelis and renamed to Tel Aviv. Farfour is replaced as co-host in episode 202 by Nahoul, his bumblebee cousin. The idea for the story arc involving Farfour's death came from Al-Sha'arawi. It was initially claimed that the death of Farfour was intended to usher in a new direction for the show.

Other Hamas children's programs have used the Mickey Mouse image to incite terror activities.

The Disney corporation initially had no public statement on the use of Mickey Mouse's image in the Farfour character; Disney CEO Robert Iger later said, "We were appalled by the use of our character to disseminate that kind of message." He explained the initial quiet by saying, "I just didn't think it would have any effect... I think it should have been obvious how the company felt about the subject.".

Nahoul (July 2007–Feb 2008) 

Nahoul (also rendered as Nahul or Nahool) is a costumed bumblebee character with a high-pitched voice who co-hosted Tomorrow's Pioneers with Saraa following Farfour's martyrdom during an Israeli interrogation. The decision to use a bee as the second host was explained by Hazim Al-Sha'arawi in an Al Jazeera interview as stemming from the fact that bees are serious, organized, and mentioned in the Qur'an. When introduced on Friday, July 13, 2007, he promised "revenge upon the enemies of God, the murderers of the prophets," explaining "I want to continue in the path of Farfour - the path of Islam, of heroism, of martyrdom, of the mujahideen."

On the show, Nahoul has expressed terrorist views. He has stated such things as: "We will liberate Al-Aqsa from the filth of the criminal Jews," and "We will go on Jihad when we grow up." In episode 204, Nahoul visits the zoo where streaks of cruelty become apparent for the (first?) time. Nahoul states: "The cats here are asleep - the poor, wretched, imprisoned cats. I feel like abusing them. This cat is asleep. I feel like attacking it." Nahoul then proceeds to swing cats by their tails and throw them around their cage. Saraa later chides him for this.

In February 2008, it was revealed that Nahoul was very sick and in need of an operation. Although Nahoul and his parents travelled to Al-Arish they could not leave Gaza and effectuate the passage to Egypt for medical treatment. He dies, what the show calls "a martyr's death," in the arms of his parents. His brother was notably absent. Nahoul is replaced as co-host by Assoud, his rabbit brother.

Assoud (February 2008–January 2009) 

Assoud (also rendered as Assud), a Bugs Bunny or Roger Rabbit-like rabbit character whose name means lion, was introduced after his brother, the previous co-host, Nahoul, died of illness. In explaining why he is called Assoud (lion), when Arnoub (rabbit) would be more appropriate, Assoud explains that "A rabbit is a term for a bad person and coward. And I, Assoud, will finish off the Jews and eat them." Before Nahoul's death, Assoud lived in Lebanon; he returned "in order to return to the homeland and liberate it." On his deathbed, he instructs Palestinian children that they must fight and die to liberate Haifa, Tel Aviv and other Israeli cities.  Assoud hinted in episode 302 that he would be replaced by a tiger when he was martyred.

On the 2 January 2009, episode, Assoud was seen dying in a Gaza hospital after being injured in an Israeli attack.

Nassur (February–October 2009)

Nassur, a brown bear, is the final co-host of Tomorrow's Pioneers. He claims to have come to the Gaza Strip to become one of the mujahideen and to defend the children of Palestine (although he gives evidence that he may have come from Iran). As such he has vowed in his debut episode on February 13, 2009, to "join the 'Izz Al-Din Al-Qassam Brigades where his activities will include such things as "wag[ing] Jihad" and "carry[ing] a gun." He survives in the series finale.

Episodes

Due to political instability and regional conflict between Hamas and Fatah parties, the show has not maintained uninterrupted broadcasting. In June 2007 during the Battle of Gaza, the Al-Aqsa TV station was taken over and shut down by Fatah gunmen. In January 2008, Fatah members abducted several Al-Aqsa TV station crew members. In September 2008, Fatah also began broadcasting a competing show targeting children on the Official PA TV network. Further complicating regular broadcast of Tomorrow's Pioneers were controversies surrounding the show itself. Palestinian Information Minister, Mustafa Barghouti successfully lobbied to have the show shut down for a time although this ban was later lifted. Factors such as these lead to broadcast dates often being irregular.

Note: With the exception of episode #20 (the fourth episode of Season 4) whose original airdate was a Tuesday, the original airdate for all other episodes was a Friday.

Season 1: April 2007-June 2007

Season 2: July 2007-February 2008

Season 3: February 2008-January 2009

Season 4: February 2009-October 2009

Controversies

Criticisms and responses
The show, brought to Western attention by pro-Israel organizations such as Palestinian Media Watch and MEMRI, supposedly deals with Islamic traditions and lifestyles, some as innocuous as the importance of drinking milk, and Muslim customs such as performing one's daily prayers, but also advocates messages of Islamism such as "Resistance Jihad", and the loathing of Israel, the capitalist economic system, the United States, and Western world.

According to Palestinian Media Watch, two animal character co-hosts, the Mickey Mouse look-alike Farfour and Nahoul the bee were used to "champion violence, promote hatred of Israel and preach about world Islamic supremacy." Later in the show's narrative, the characters were, as the show described it, "martyred," with the deaths either directly or implicitly blamed on "The Jews, Israel, Israelis, and/or what they believed to be Zionists."

Criticisms concerning the content and methods employed in the broadcast of Tomorrow's Pioneers have come from a variety of sources. Israeli officials and critics from the Anti-Defamation League have denounced the program as incendiary and outrageous in content. Watchdog groups, PMW and MEMRI have described the show as "anti-Israeli," and PMW has commented on the show's "champion[ing of] violence, promot[ion of] hatred of Israel and preach[ing] about world Islamic supremacy." Within the Arabic community, critics have suggested that the show has potential to introduce bias in children at an age when they are unable to properly differentiate between political viewpoints. Harsher Arabic and Palestinian critics have suggested that the show is nothing short of an attempt at the indoctrination of children.

On the other hand, defenders of the show have suggested that the show's notoriety stands as yet more proof of the political motivations behind the anti-Arabist and Islamophobic subjection of Palestinians to the strictest scrutiny and subsequent generalizations of Arabs to support an improper negative stereotype. The argument has been advanced that "Israel is following all the Palestinians, large and small, and placing them under a microscope with a predefined concept of culture, media and religion. It only wants to catch up [Palestinians] and accuse them on themes of terrorism." Criticism of the show has been regarded as criticism of Islam as a religion.

Furthermore, proponents of the show claim that Saraa Barhoum is only an "innocent girl ... incapable of incitement." It has also been suggested by a variety of sources that, holding judgment aside, the show's content is simply reflective of the realities of life in the occupied territory. Relatedly, it is argued that Zionist critics in particular are disturbed by the fact that the show provides "Arab and Muslim children [with] the opportunity to participate in [a public forum context] to freely express their real feelings [regarding life in] Palestine." Defenders of the show have argued that the reason for the harsh criticism the show has received is that unlike many Arabic television stations Al-Aqsa TV reflects a view of Palestinian thought unfettered by Western social mores. The timing of certain critical publications has also been considered provocative.

Removal by the Palestinian Ministry
After attracting international attention for its use of the Mickey Mouse-lookalike, Farfour, Palestinian Information Minister Mustafa Barghouti stated the use of the character was a "mistaken approach" and the program was pulled from Hamas-affiliated Al-Aqsa TV and placed under review at his ministry's request.

Al-Aqsa TV board chairman Fathi Hamad replied that the station would neither pull the program, nor change the subject matter. He stated that "[t]his campaign of criticism is part of a plan orchestrated by the West and the occupying power to attack Islam on the one hand and the Palestinian cause on the other." An Al-Aqsa TV representative responded to Barghouti's statements, saying that the station will continue to air the show and that "Barghouti misunderstood the issue." In a later interview with Al-Aqsa TV, Hamad explained that "the vicious campaign that is being waged by the enemies, and especially the Zionist enemy and American imperialism, is not new. It comes from the framework of the vicious campaign against our Palestinian people as an addition to the siege placed on our people. Therefore, we are not surprised by this. They want the Palestinian people to renounce its Islamic religion and belief. In response, we say that whenever our Palestinian people resorted to its religion, Allah supported it. Therefore, we will not renounce our faith and our belief, and we will move forward for the sake of Allah. We are holding to this religion because it is the secret of our victory. They try, as much as they can... Not just by waging their attack on the religion in this context, in order to prevent the Islamic upbringing of Palestinian children, but they also want this people to renounce all its Islamic foundation. They are the ones who called to remove the Jihad verses that appear in the Palestinian school curricula. Therefore, we cannot accept this."

Criticism from Disney
76-year-old Diane Disney Miller, Mickey Mouse creator Walt Disney's last surviving child, commented to the press that, "What we're dealing with here is pure evil and you can't ignore that." She further commented that, "It's not just [about] Mickey, it's [about] indoctrinating children like this, teaching them to be evil. The world loves children, and this is just going against the grain of humanity."

In a response letter by Tomorrow's Pioneers director, Fathi Hammad, said: "Before ... [anyone] object[s] to our [program], we are trying to install in our children's memories the interest in [the] lift[ing of] the siege on our people and [the end of] support for the usurper entity of our land and killing our children. ... [T]he Palestinian people continue to struggle not indifferent to such [as] are left with the executioner and victim." Nevertheless, the show's creators arranged the production of an episode shortly after in which Farfour was martyred off to be replaced by his bumble-bee brother, Nahoul. This arranged martyrdom came in direct response to actions by the Disney family.

Several months later, Hamas television again made use of Disney characters, this time in a five-minute cartoon attacking Fatah. The clip depicted the competing movement and its former local leader Mohammed Dahlan as corrupt and anti-Islamic rats, while portraying Hamas as a confident lion based on the Simba character from the 1994 film The Lion King. While Hamas TV executive Hazam Sharawi said the clip was pulled for revising, including removal of the Dahlan depiction, he said there were no plans to remove reference to The Lion King.

In September 2008, Fatah also began broadcasting a competing show targeting children on the Official PA TV network. This program also features use of Mickey and Minnie Mouse.

Criticism from the United States
On April 1, 2008, Rep. Joseph Crowley submitted House Resolution No. 1069 in the United States House of Representatives, a resolution "[c]ondemning the use of television programming by Hamas to indoctrinate hatred, violence, and anti-Semitism toward Israel in young Palestinian children." The resolution discusses Tomorrow's Pioneers by name, specifically stating that:

Whereas Hamas uses their television network, Al-Aqsa TV, to air a children's show 'Tomorrow's Pioneers' to breed new terrorists through hatred for Israel and Western nations; ... Whereas in February 2008, Hamas used a Bugs Bunny look-alike to indoctrinate children by inciting them toward hatred and violence by telling children that he 'will finish off the Jews and eat them'; Whereas in May 2007, Hamas used a Mickey Mouse look-alike in the same children's program to teach terrorist doctrines to children; ...  the House of Representatives condemns Hamas for using a children's television program to incite hatred, violence, and anti-Semitism toward Israel; and demands that Hamas immediately suspend all television programming that incites hatred, violence, and anti-Semitism toward Israel ...

Translation controversy
Several commentators, such as CNN's Arabic department, have claimed that the transcript of the April 13 show (2007) provided by MEMRI contains numerous translation errors and undue emphases. Brian Whitaker, the Middle East editor for British newspaper The Guardian, wrote in a blog for the newspaper that in the translation of the video, showing Farfour eliciting political comments from a young girl named Sanabel, the MEMRI transcript misrepresents the segment where he asks what she will do, by attributing a sentence said by Farfour, ("I'll shoot"), to the child while ignoring the child's actual reply ("I'm going to draw a picture").
Whitaker further criticized MEMRI's translation. He and others commented that a statement uttered by the same child, ("We're going to [or want to] resist"), had been given an unduly aggressive interpretation by MEMRI as ("We want to fight"). Also, where MEMRI translated the girl as saying the highly controversial remark ("We will annihilate the Jews"), Whitaker and others, including Arabic speakers used by CNN, insist that based on careful listening to the low quality video clip, the girl is variously interpreted as saying, "The Jews [will] shoot[] us" or "The Jews are killing us." Other sources have also pointed out that MEMRI's translation "I will commit martyrdom" should more accurately have been "I'll become a martyr" – a passive statement rather than an active/aggressive threat.

CNN's Glenn Beck had planned to run MEMRI's translation on his radio programme but was stopped by his producer. Beck then invited Yigal Carmon, a former colonel of IDF Intelligence and founder and President of MEMRI, on to the programme where Carmon denounced CNN's Arabic translation.

MEMRI defends their translation of the show, Yigal Carmon declared, "Yes, we stand by the translation by the very words, by the context, by the syntax, and every measure of the translation."

See also

Brainwashing

References

External links
 Al-Aqsa TV and Radio homepage
 
 Dean, W. Facts on the Ground. 14 May 2007. - comparative translation highlighting contested CNN translations (see above)
 برنامج عبر الأثير: أفنان وأغصان - Al-Aqsa Voice streaming broadcast of Ovan and Branches.

2007 television series debuts
2009 television series endings
2000s children's television series
Palestinian culture
Religious educational television series
Hamas
Mickey Mouse
Mass media and entertainment controversies
Mass media in the State of Palestine
Obscenity controversies in television
Political drama television series
Propaganda television broadcasts
Palestinian television shows
Race-related controversies in television
Religious controversies in television
Islam and antisemitism
Anti-Americanism